Takhtialif (Russian and Tajik: Тахтиалиф, also: Takhtakhamit) is a village in central Tajikistan. It is part of the jamoat Chashmasor in Fayzobod District, one of the Districts of Republican Subordination. It lies near the river Elok, a tributary of the Kofarnihon. It is on the Pamir Highway, 40 kilometers east of Dushanbe, and has a Köppen climate classification of Dsa.

References

Populated places in Districts of Republican Subordination